Money Train is the soundtrack to the 1995 motion picture Money Train. Although the reception of the album was lukewarm, it managed to spawn a hit single, "Top of the Stairs", which was performed by Skee-Lo.

The single peaked at #73 on Billboard's Hot R&B/Hip-Hop Singles & Tracks sales chart.

Track listing
"The Train Is Coming [Money Train Remix]" Shaggy with Ken Boothe – 4:09
"Top of the Stairs" Skee Lo – 4:31
"Do You Know [*]" Total – 3:26
"Show You the Way to Go" Men Of Vizion – 5:30
"Hiding Place [*]" Assorted Phlavors, Patra – 4:33
"Making Love" 112 – 5:45
"The Thrill I'm In" Luther Vandross – 4:14
"Still Not over You" Trey Lorenz – 4:52
"It's Alright [*]" Terri & Monica – 4:34
"Oh Baby" Four Point O – 3:58
"Merry-Go-Round [*]" UBU – 4:07
"Hold On! I'm Comin'" The Neville Brothers – 3:38
"Money Train Suite" Mark Mancina – 4:50
Albums produced by Teddy Riley
1995 soundtrack albums
Action film soundtracks